Mary Gay Scanlon (born August 30, 1959) is an American attorney and politician. A member of the Democratic Party, she has represented  in the United States House of Representatives since 2019. The district is based in Delaware County, a mostly suburban county west of Philadelphia, and also includes parts of South and Southwest Philadelphia and slivers of Chester and Montgomery counties. She was elected to both positions on November 6, 2018. That day, she ran in a special election in the old 7th to serve out the term of her predecessor, Pat Meehan, and in a regular election for a full two-year term in the new 5th. She was sworn in as the member for the 7th on November 13, 2018, and transferred to the 5th on January 3, 2019.

Early life and education
Scanlon was born in Watertown, New York. She is the daughter of Daniel J. Scanlon Jr. and Carol Florence Yehle, and has two sisters, Elizabeth Maura Scanlon and M. Kathleen Scanlon. Her father was an attorney and was appointed part-time magistrate in 1971 and full-time magistrate in 1993. Her maternal grandfather, Leo J. Yehle, was a family-court judge who helped write the first juvenile justice code in New York in the 1960s.

Scanlon earned her B.A. from Colgate University in 1980 and her J.D. from the University of Pennsylvania Law School in 1984. Upon completing her education, she became a judicial law clerk for Judge J. Sydney Hoffman of the Superior Court of Pennsylvania.

Legal career
In 1985, Scanlon represented a sexually abused 11-year-old girl in a dependency case. This experience made Scanlon decide to pursue a career in public interest law. In 1994, she received the Fidelity Award, the highest award for public service from the Philadelphia Bar Association.

Scanlon served as an attorney with the Education Law Center of Philadelphia, helping implement special education laws, before joining Ballard Spahr as pro bono counsel. There she helped coordinate the provision of free legal services to low-income recipients. She partnered with the Wills for Heroes Foundation, providing legal documents free of charge to first responders. She helped a young woman from Guinea who had sickle-cell disease obtain permanent residency.

In 2006, she was appointed vice chair of the Tax Commission. The following year, she joined the board of the Wallingford-Swarthmore School District and served as its president from 2009 to 2011. She continued as a member of the board until 2015.

U.S. House of Representatives

Elections

2018 general 

On February 25, 2018, Scanlon launched her campaign for US Congress in Pennsylvania's 5th district in the 2018 election. The district had previously been the 7th, represented by four-term Republican Pat Meehan, who had announced a month earlier that he was not running for reelection. She kicked off the campaign by giving a speech at  Swarthmore Rutledge School. The seat was one of several that had been significantly redrawn by the Pennsylvania Supreme Court, which ruled that the previous map had been an unconstitutional partisan Republican gerrymander. The redrawn 5th covers all of Delaware County, slivers of Montgomery and Chester counties, and the southwestern corner of Philadelphia, including the areas around the South Philadelphia Sports Complex and Philadelphia International Airport. Scanlon said that her interest in running was also piqued by the fact that Pennsylvania had no women in its congressional delegation. She was endorsed by former Pennsylvania governor Ed Rendell and the Philadelphia Inquirer.

On May 15, Scanlon won the 10-person primary with 16,831 votes, or a 28.4% share of the votes cast. Her closest competitor was former Assistant United States Attorney for United States District Court for the Eastern District of Pennsylvania Ashley Lunkenheimer, who received 9,060 votes or a 15.3% share. "Tonight we can revel in this moment," Scanlon said in her acceptance of the Democratic nomination. "You all here have once again rewritten history in Delaware County. Tonight, we made it possible for this new district for the first time to be represented by a Democrat in Congress and to be represented by a woman in Congress." The new 5th is more compact and Democratic than its predecessor. Had it existed in 2016, Hillary Clinton would have won it with 63% of the vote, which would have been her third-best performance in the state and her strongest outside of the Philadelphia-based districts. By comparison, Clinton won the old 7th with 49% of the vote.

2018 special 

Meehan resigned from the House on April 27, 2018, a month before the primary. Scanlon was named the Democratic candidate in a special election to succeed him. As a result, she ran in two elections on November 6, a special election for the balance of Meehan's fourth term in the old 7th and a regular election for a full two-year term in the new 5th. Her Republican opponent was prosecutor Pearl Kim.

2018 election results
On November 6, Scanlon defeated Kim in both the special and regular elections. The margin was much closer in the special election for the 7th district because it took place under the old district lines that had been thrown out by the state supreme court earlier in the year.

She was sworn into her 7th district seat on November 13, 2018, in a ceremony attended by Hawa Salih, a Sudanese human rights activist whom Scanlon helped gain asylum in the U.S. She was one of four Democratic women elected to Congress from Pennsylvania in 2018. The others were Madeleine Dean, Chrissy Houlahan and Susan Wild. The state's congressional delegation had previously been all male. She is only the third Democrat to represent this district and its predecessors since 1939.

2020 

On November 3, 2020, Scanlon defeated Republican nominee Dasha Pruett with 64.7% of the vote (255,743 votes) to Pruett's 35.3% (139,552).

She transferred to the 5th district in January 2019, with two months' more seniority than the other freshmen elected in 2018.

Tenure 
In 2021, Scanlon introduced the ACCESS Act of 2021, which would mandate data portability on major tech platforms.

Syria 
In 2023, Scanlon was among 56 Democrats to vote in favor of H.Con.Res. 21 which directed President Joe Biden to remove U.S. troops from Syria within 180 days.

Committee assignments 
House Administration Committee (Vice Chair)
Committee on the Judiciary
Subcommittee on the Constitution, Civil Rights and Civil Liberties
Subcommittee on Immigration and Citizenship
Committee on Rules

Caucus memberships
Congressional Progressive Caucus

Electoral history

Political positions
According to the Delaware County Daily Times, Scanlon's policy interests "include the need for fair elections; challenges to free speech; access to health care and public education; human rights for the victims of economic and political oppression; gun control; and threats to the environment." She is in favor of universal pre-K and supports marijuana decriminalization. In order to reduce the federal deficit, Scanlon wants to roll back Tax Cuts and Jobs Act. On the subject of a $15 minimum wage, she says she likes it "as a goal, but I do think we need to be careful and probably stage it."

Personal life
Scanlon lives in Swarthmore with her husband, Mark Stewart. They have three adult children.

Scanlon was the victim of a carjacking on December 22, 2021, during which she was robbed at gunpoint. The crime took place in South Philadelphia, after Scanlon finished touring Franklin Delano Roosevelt Park that day. She was physically unharmed. The Delaware State Police and the Federal Bureau of Investigation recovered Scanlon's car later in the day in New Castle County, Delaware, near the Christiana Mall. Five people, who were inside the car when police found it, were taken into custody about six hours after the carjacking. Their ages were 13, 14, 15, 16, and 19. Scanlon's spokesperson, Lauren Cox, told CNN, "She thanks the Philadelphia Police Department for their swift response, and appreciates the efforts of both the Sergeant at Arms in D.C. and her local police department for coordinating with Philly PD to ensure her continued safety."

See also 
 Women in the United States House of Representatives

References

External links 

 Congresswoman Mary Gay Scanlon official U.S. House website
 Mary Gay Scanlon for Congress official campaign website

|-

|-

1959 births
21st-century American politicians
21st-century American women politicians
American women lawyers
Candidates in the 2018 United States elections
Colgate University alumni
Democratic Party members of the United States House of Representatives from Pennsylvania
Female members of the United States House of Representatives
Living people
Pennsylvania lawyers
Politicians from Syracuse, New York
Politicians from Watertown, New York
University of Pennsylvania Law School alumni
Women in Pennsylvania politics
American gun control activists